HopSkipDrive is a vehicle for hire company that provides service to children. It has operations in eight metropolitan areas in the United States. It is aimed at children between the ages of 1 and 12 years who are legally restricted to use other vehicle for hire services. The service can be accessed by parents via a mobile app. The service employs mostly female drivers who have at least five years of experience in childcare.

History
In 2013, Joanna McFarland and Janelle McGlothlin met at a children's party where the idea about "hiring moms and babysitters to drive kids around" originated. Later, they teamed up with Carolyn Yashari Becher, a former real estate lawyer, and founded the company.

The service launched in May 2015.

In January 2016, the company raised $10.2 million in a Series A round.

In August 2018, the service launched in San Diego.

In March 2019, the service launched in Washington, D.C.

In August 2021, the company raised $25 million in a Series C round.

References

Companies based in California